Turkaili is an Indian village in Araria district, Bihar State.

References

India